Maria Fyfe (née O'Neill; 25 November 1938 – 3 December 2020) was a Scottish politician and educator who served as Member of Parliament for Glasgow Maryhill from 1987 to 2001. She was Deputy Shadow Minister for Women from 1988 to 1991, Convener of the Scottish Group of Labour MPs from 1991 to 1992 and front bench spokesperson for Scotland from 1992 to 1995. Fyfe campaigned for 50-50 representation of women in the Scottish Parliament.

Early life
She was the daughter of James O'Neill, a clerk, tram driver and shopworker, and Margaret Lacey, a former shop assistant. She was born in Gorbals, Glasgow, and was educated at Notre Dame High School. She became a member of the Labour Party in 1960. She returned to education as a mature student, studying Economic History at the University of Strathclyde and graduated in 1975 with a BA (Hons). She worked as a senior lecturer in the Trade Union Studies Unit at Glasgow Central College of Commerce from 1978 to 1987. In 1980, she was elected to Glasgow District Council, serving first as Vice-Convener of the Finance Committee from 1980 to 1984 followed by being Convener of the Personnel Committee until 1987, when she was elected to Parliament.

Parliamentary career
At the 1987 general election, Fyfe was returned to Parliament as Member for Glasgow Maryhill, a position she occupied until the 2001 general election. She served as Deputy Shadow Minister for Women from 1988 to 1991, Convener of the Scottish Group of Labour MPs from 1991 to 1992, and front bench spokesperson for Scotland from 1992 to 1995. She did not stand for reelection at the 2001 General Election and was succeeded by Ann McKechin. Fyfe was awarded an honorary D.Univ. by the University of Glasgow in 2002.

She was quoted as saying: "I am proudest of having been involved in the 50-50 campaign to ensure that the Scottish Parliament started life with an almost equal representation of women, up there with the Scandinavian countries". After standing down Fyfe continued to campaign politically including on the issue of homelessness. She also chaired the campaign to erect a statue of Glasgow councillor and rent strike campaigner Mary Barbour.

Personal life
She was from humble beginnings being born in a slum. The then Maria O'Neill married James Joseph Fyfe in 1964; the couple had two sons. Her husband pre-deceased her.

Fyfe was interviewed in 2012 as part of The History of Parliament's oral history project. She wrote two autobiographies, the first entitled A Problem Like Maria describing her work as an MP, and a second book Singing in the Streets, about her life growing up in the Gorbals in the aftermath of the Second World War, as well as her earlier political career.

Fyfe died on 3 December 2020, at age 82, after a short illness.

References
 ‘Fyfe, Maria’, Who's Who 2009, A & C Black, 2008; online edn, Oxford University Press, Dec 2008 accessed 28 April 2009

External links 
 

1938 births
2020 deaths
20th-century Scottish women politicians
20th-century Scottish politicians
21st-century Scottish women politicians
21st-century Scottish politicians
Alumni of the University of Strathclyde
Female members of the Parliament of the United Kingdom for Scottish constituencies
Maryhill
Members of the Parliament of the United Kingdom for Glasgow constituencies
Place of birth missing
Place of death missing
Scottish Labour Party (1976) politicians
Scottish Labour MPs
Scottish Labour councillors
Scottish socialists
Transport and General Workers' Union-sponsored MPs
UK MPs 1987–1992
UK MPs 1992–1997
UK MPs 1997–2001
Women councillors in Glasgow